Veit Kempe (born 27 October 1955 in Dresden, Sachsen) is a German former pair skater who represented East Germany. He is best known for his partnership with Kerstin Stolfig. The pair placed sixth at the 1976 Winter Olympics and became two-time East German national silver medalists.

Earlier in his career, Kempe competed with Sylvia Konzack.

Results

With Stolfig

With Konzack

External links
Sports-Reference.com

1955 births
German male pair skaters
Figure skaters at the 1976 Winter Olympics
Olympic figure skaters of East Germany
Living people
Sportspeople from Dresden
20th-century German people
21st-century German people